Marengo is an unincorporated community in Adams County, Washington. A line of the Union Pacific Railroad runs through the community.

The community's name commemorates the Battle of Marengo.

References

Unincorporated communities in Adams County, Washington
Unincorporated communities in Washington (state)